Charlu or Cherlu may refer to:
 Charlu, Hashtrud
 Cherlu, Sarab